Tower of Terror (Italian:La torre dell'espiazione) is a 1913 Italian silent film directed by Roberto Roberti and starring Bice Valerian.

Cast
 Antonietta Calderari 
 Frederico Elvezi 
 Antonio Greco (credited as Signor Greco) 
 Giovanni Pezzinga 
 Roberto Roberti 
 Angiolina Solari 
 Bice Valerian

References

Bibliography
 Aldo Bernardini, Vittorio Martinelli. Il cinema muto italiano, Volume 5, Part 2. Nuova ERI, 1994.

External links

1913 films
1910s Italian-language films
Films directed by Roberto Roberti
Italian silent feature films
Italian black-and-white films